Glenwood Township may refer to:

 Glenwood Township, Mills County, Iowa
 Glenwood Township, Winneshiek County, Iowa, in Winneshiek County, Iowa
 Glenwood Township, Phillips County, Kansas, in Phillips County, Kansas
 Glenwood Township, Pope County, Minnesota
 Glenwood Township, Schuyler County, Missouri
 Glenwood Township, Gage County, Nebraska
 Glenwood Township, Walsh County, North Dakota
 Glenwood Township, Clay County, South Dakota, in Clay County, South Dakota
 Glenwood Township, Deuel County, South Dakota, in Deuel County, South Dakota

Township name disambiguation pages